Ferit is a Turkish spelling of the Arabic masculine given name Farid (Arabic: فَرِيد fariyd, farīd) meaning "unique, singular ("the One"), incomparable". The name is also found in Albania and Macedonia. 

People named Ferit include:

 Ferit Hoxha, Permanent Representative of Albania to the United Nations
 Ferit Melen, Turkish civil servant and politician 
 Ferit Şahenk, Turkish businessman
 Ferit Odman, Turkish jazz musician
Ali Ferit Gören (1913-1987), Austrian-Turkish Olympic sprinter

Turkish masculine given names